Rihab Elwalid (born 14 June 1998) is a Tunisian archer. She won the silver medal in the women's recurve event at the 2019 African Games held in Rabat, Morocco. She competed in the women's individual event at the 2020 Summer Olympics held in Tokyo, Japan.

She competed in the women's individual and mixed team events at the 2022 Mediterranean Games held in Oran, Algeria.

References

External links
 

1998 births
Living people
Tunisian female archers
African Games silver medalists for Tunisia
African Games medalists in archery
Competitors at the 2019 African Games
Olympic archers of Tunisia
Archers at the 2020 Summer Olympics
Place of birth missing (living people)
Competitors at the 2022 Mediterranean Games
Mediterranean Games competitors for Tunisia
21st-century Tunisian women